Kisungule is an administrative ward in Mtwara-Mikindani District of Mtwara Region in Tanzania. 
According to the 2012 census, the ward has a total population of 1,123.

References

Wards of Mtwara Region